Ekapum Lep is a small uninhabited island in the Pacific Ocean, a part of the Shefa Province of Vanuatu.

Geography
The island lies 8 km south of Port-Vila.

References

Islands of Vanuatu
Shefa Province